Seeds of Hope Publishers is a nonprofit group of believers responding to a common burden for the poor and hungry of God's world, and acting on the strong belief that Judeo-Christian biblical mandates to feed the poor were not intended to be optional. The group intends to seek out people of faith who feel called to care for people in poverty. They hope to do so by informing and inspiring a variety of responses through publications and resources including periodicals, newsletters, and worship materials. Seeds published its first newsletter in 1979 and, although the publications have metamorphosed over the years, has maintained  ever since.

Seeds of Hope is housed by the community of faith at Seventh & James Baptist Church in Waco, Texas.

History
In 1977, a mission group at Oakhurst Baptist Church in Decatur, Georgia (which was, at that time, a Southern Baptist church) came together with a common burden for people living with hunger and poverty. Gary Gunderson and Andy Loving, members of that group, sent out a mimeographed one-page newsletter to 600 Southern Baptists. This was the beginning of Seeds.

The next year the group produced the first issue of Seeds in magazine format (with the subtitle “Southern Baptists Concerned about Hunger”) and a “miss-a-meal” book of 30 meditations entitled Roots of Hope. The publication, Seeds Magazine, then began a bimonthly format with an alternating supplement called Sprouts.

By 1982, the ministry had expanded to include other Christian groups, and the subtitle on the banner changed to “Christians Concerned about Hunger.” That year the editors published a Seeds Reader on Women and Hunger, which won the prestigious Hunger Media Award given by World Hunger Year.

In 1983, the Seeds folks created, with Alternatives for Simple Living, All Tied Up, one of the first weekend huger education retreats in the United States. The next year, working with an ecumenical coalition of denominational hunger programs, Seeds published A Guide to World Hunger Organizations, by Lou Knowles. In 1985, Seeds won a second World Hunger Media award for another Seeds Reader on "The Church and Hunger."

A special tenth anniversary issue, produced in partnership with UNICEF, on Child Survival took the staff to West Africa, Brazil and Indonesia in 1987. Also that year, Seeds published the Hunger Action Handbook, by Leslie Withers and Tom Peterson, which can still be found on the desks of social workers and college professors who are interested in hunger issues. Seeds also won the Metropolitan Atlanta Community Foundation for Outstanding Nonprofit Management in 1987.

In 1991, Seeds of Hope, Inc. was formed in Waco, Texas, and, after a blessing ceremony at Oakhurst Baptist Church, the Seeds ministry moved onto the campus of Seventh and James Baptist Church, with Katie Cook as editor and Susan Hansen as business manager/associate editor. The Waco staff and Council of Stewards began by publishing Roots of Hope, Volume II, a book of 40 meditations on hunger, written by hunger leaders from different Christian denominations as well as other faiths. They continued publishing Seeds Magazine and the supplement Sprouts for six years. In 1984, they worked again with an ecumenical coalition of hunger programs to produce A Guide to World Hunger Organizations, Volume II by Michael Williamson.

Awards

Hunger News & Hope, a periodical about hunger, poverty, and food justice, is published quarterly by Seeds of Hope Publishers, in partnership with Alliance of Baptists, American Baptist Churches USA, and Cooperative Baptist Fellowship. Recently, the newsletter received four Associated Church Press awards for work in 2017.

Hunger News & Hope has received the following Associated Church Press awards:

 For work in 2014:

The “Best in Class” Award of Merit;

The Award of Merit for a Theme Issue for the Summer 2014 issue, "US Prisons and Poverty.”

 For work in 2015:

The “Best in Class” Award of Merit;

The Award of Merit for a Theme Issue for the Summer 2015 issue, “Food Security and Immigration.”

 For work in 2016:

The “Best in Class” Award of Merit;

The Award of Excellence for a Theme Issue for the Summer 2016 issue, “Women in Poverty.”

 For work in 2017:

The “Best in Class” Award of Excellence;

The Award of Merit for a Feature Article for Chelle Samaniego's “The Perfect Storm: How Aid Cuts, Drought & War Will Kill 20 Million People This Year If We Don’t Help”;

The Award of Merit for In-depth Coverage for Linda Freeto's “Special Report: US Poverty, Food Security & the Federal Budget”;

Honorable Mention for a Theme Issue for the Summer 2017 issue, “How the Federal Budget Will Affect People in Poverty.”

 For work in 2018:

The “Best in Class” Award of Merit;

Honorable Mention for a Devotional or Inspirational Article for “The Real Sermon” by Robert Darden;

The Award of Merit for a Feature Article for “How 2017 Natural Hazards Affected Food Security” by Rachel Boyle;

Honorable Mention for In-Depth Coverage for Linda Freeto's Special Report, “Water Issues at Home and Abroad”; and

Honorable Mention for a Theme Issue for the Summer 2018 issue, “From Water Crisis to Water Justice.”

 For work in 2019:

The Award of Excellence for “Best in Class” in the newspaper/newsletter category;

The Award of Merit for an Editorial by Katie Cook, “New SNAP Measure Will Rule Out 668,000 People.”

 For work in 2020:

The "Best in Class" Award of Merit

The Award of Merit for a News Story for "Grace Baptist Church Sees a Different Way," about a church that refused to close down its homeless shelter after a stabbing, by Dawn Michelle Michals, and

The Award of Merit for a Theme Issue for the Fall 2020 issue about COVID-19 & Minoritized Populations.

Notable writers

Seeds of Hope publications have included contributions from number of notable writers, including such Nobel Peace Prize laureates as Mother Teresa, Jimmy Carter, and Muhammad Yunus,. Other writers include pioneers and leaders in the global anti-hunger movement such as Art Simon, founder of Bread for the World;, David Beckmann, president of Bread for the World, the late U.S. Senator Mark Hatfield, Frances Moore Lappé, founder of the Institute for Food and Development Policy (Food First), Ron Sider, and many others.

Current publications

In 1998, Seeds Magazine began its metamorphosis into Seeds of Hope Publishers. In its new incarnation, the staff and council continues the original Seeds mission to produce unique resources about issues surrounding hunger and poverty. After extensive polling among subscribers and church leaders, they first created Sacred Seasons, a series of worship resource kits with a biblical emphasis on justice issues, particularly hunger and poverty. The packets are designed for liturgical seasons, including Advent, Christmastide, Lent & Eastertide. A Hunger Emphasis packet comes out in late summer each year.

The next year, the Waco staff began negotiations with some of the same groups with whom the Decatur staff had worked, for a partnership that would produce Hunger News & Hope, a quarterly newsletter that has been distributed through religious denominations to thousands of hunger educators and other individuals. The original denominations were: American Baptist Churches USA; Baptist General Convention of Texas; Christian Church (Disciples of Christ); Christian Reformed Church in North America; Covenant World Relief, Cooperative Baptist Fellowship; Evangelical Lutheran Church in America; Presbyterian Church USA; Reformed Church in America; and United Methodist Committee on Relief.

14 and 15 years later, the Seeds staff is still producing these two resources. When the world began to go online for its information, the Cooperative Baptist Fellowship helped the Seeds folks to establish a website, so that most of the resources would be available for no charge to anyone needing help in keeping these issues on the minds of congregations. Most of the back issues of Hunger News & Hope and Sacred Seasons are readily accessible on the Seeds website, along with several special collections.

For three years, Seeds partnered with the American Baptist Church International Ministries program to produce worship collections on peace. With sponsorship from the Alliance of Baptists, the staff also created Speaking of Hunger, a collection of hunger sermons, and Hope Is in Our Hands, a collection of activities on hunger for children and youth. The staff also created Developing a Heart for the Hungry, a primer for churches that are planning a hunger emphasis for the first time.

In addition, the Seeds website and Facebook page feature two collections of dramatic monologues for children. One, called Easter Walk, includes twelve monologues from the events of Holy Week and is one of the most popular Seeds resources. The other, "With Our Own Eyes," includes seven monologues drawn from the resurrection narratives in the Gospels of Matthew, Mark, Luke and John. Photos from churches that have held Easter Walk events are posted on the Seeds Facebook page.

A discussion of eight elements in the lifestyle of Jesus Christ, called ChristStyle, is also a popular Seeds resource. Written by Daniel B. McGee and Katie Cook, this essay is drawn from a series of articles about the beatitudes (Matthew 5:1-6) from Seeds Magazine and has been presented in a number of retreat and seminar settings.

Art of Compassion
In 2002, Rebecca Ward, an art history student at the University of Texas in Austin, was given a grant to organize an art show for Seeds. In August of that year, the Art of Compassion: Images of Hunger and Hope show was launched at Seventh and James Baptist Church. The show featured illustrations from Seeds publications, plus a number of new creations in various media (including wood chippings, a decoupaged communion set, several large oil paintings and sculpture), mostly from artists who had contributed work to Seeds in the past. Rebecca and another University of Texas student, Elana Solano, organized a second show in 2004.

Current staff and volunteers
Seeds of Hope Publishers is led by editor L. Katherine Cook. Its business manager is John Segrest. The lead copy editor is Ellen Kuniyuki Brown. The lead artist is Sally Lynn Askins, a professor of theatre design at Baylor University. Writing and art used in publications are donated by writers and artists from the United States and around the world who believe in the cause of ending hunger. These people are joined by a number of local volunteers and students from local colleges and high schools who work as interns for class credit. The work is supervised by the Council of Stewards, which acts as an editorial board, with help from a board of advisors.

The 2018 Seeds of Hope Council of Stewards:
Sara Alexander,
Guilherme Almeida,
Sally Lynn Askins (Vice President),
Meg Culler,
Meg Cooper,
Derek Dodson,
Linda Freeto,
Sandy Londos(Recording Secretary), and
B. Michael Long (President)

The 2018 Seeds of Hope Board of Advisors:
Daniel G. Bagby,
Dale A. Barron,
H. Joseph Haag,
Andy Loving,
Kathryn Mueller,
Jo Pendleton,
Jacqulin L. Saxon,
Ken Sehested,
Jon Singletary,
David Wilkinson, and
Leslie Withers

References

Further reading
 “Historic Baptist Magazine Moves to Waco, Texas,” SBC Today (now Baptists Today), July 26, 1991, page 5.
 “Bread for the Masses: Once-Dormant Publication ‘Seeds’ Resumes Mission against Hunger, ” by John Young, Waco Tribune-Herald, Sept. 13, 1992, Op-ed page.
 “Working to Sow Seeds of Hope,” by Teresa Talerico, Waco Tribune-Herald, Nov. 6, 1995, page 1A.
 “‘Seeds’ Focuses on Lifting People Out of Poverty: Editor's Life Reads Like Her Magazine, by Lori Lenarduzzi, Baylor Lariat, Oct. 28, 1997, page 1.
 “Sowing ‘Seeds’ of Hope: Mission of Hunger Magazine Reborn in Worship Packets, by Marla Pierson, Waco Tribune-Herald, Aug. 7, 1999, page 4B (Religion Section).
 “Illustrating the Reach of World Hunger,” by Terri Jo Ryan, Waco Tribune-Herald, Aug. 2002, page 3B.
 “Creating a Caring World,” by Caressa Lattimore, Waco Tribune-Herald, Aug.14, 2004, page 4B (Religion Section).

Christian publishing companies
Companies based in Waco, Texas